Adam Searle is an Australian politician. He has been a Labor Party member of the New South Wales Legislative Council since May 2011. He was the Leader of the Opposition in the Legislative Council of New South Wales between April 2015 and June 2021. He is the opposition spokesman and Shadow Minister for Industry, Resources & Energy and Shadow Minister for Industrial Relations.

Early life
Searle was born in Sydney and raised on the far north coast of NSW. He returned to Sydney to complete school and attended Sydney University.

Career
Searle joined the Australian Labor Party in 1985 and has been an active member since, holding various positions at branch and electorate council levels. He has frequently been a delegate to the NSW Annual Conference and in 2004 was a delegate to the National Conference.

He served on Blue Mountains City Council from September 1999 and was Mayor from September 2008 until September 2010. In the 2001 federal election, Searle unsuccessfully contested the federal electorate of Macquarie.

Searle worked for NSW Labor in opposition from 1994-1995 and as Chief of Staff to NSW Attorney General and Minister for Industrial Relations, Jeff Shaw, from 1995 to 2000. Adam worked on the Industrial Relations Act 1996, which was used as a model by other State Labor governments. He was also involved in significant law reform across a range of areas such as anti-discrimination, occupational health and safety and special laws for those suffering asbestos and related illnesses to ensure they receive quick and fair trials.

In 2000, Searle commenced practicing law as a barrister in the areas of employment and industrial law and has been involved in a number of leading cases, including the pay equity case for childcare workers. He is still a member of the NSW Bar Association.

He was one of the expert panel of lawyers appointed by the NSW Government to examine the law relating to workplace deaths, which led to the enactment of legislation dealing specifically with workplace fatalities in 2005.

State parliament
In May 2011, Searle was elected to the NSW Legislative Council to fill a casual vacancy caused by the resignation of former NSW Attorney General, John Hatzistergos. He was soon after elected Deputy Leader of the Labor Party in the Legislative Council and took on the role of Shadow Minister for Small Business and Industrial Relations prior to his current leadership and portfolio responsibilities. In 2015, Searle became the Leader of the Opposition in the Legislative Council.

For a week in May and June 2021, Searle was interim party leader between Jodi McKay's resignation as leader and the subsequent leadership vote. On 8 June 2021, Searle was replaced as Leader of the Opposition in the Legislative Council by Penny Sharpe.

Personal life
Searle resides in the Blue Mountains and takes an active interest local affairs. He enjoys reading and bush walking.

References

Living people
Members of the New South Wales Legislative Council
Year of birth missing (living people)
Australian Labor Party members of the Parliament of New South Wales
Australian barristers
21st-century Australian politicians
City of Blue Mountains
Mayors of places in New South Wales